Master Malati or Moallem Malati (died May 19, 1803) is a Coptic Orthodox martyr and saint.

Malati was a scribe of Ayyoub Bey el-Defterdar, one of the Mamluks of Muhammad Bey Abu al-Dhahab. When the French under Napoléon Bonaparte occupied Egypt, they formed a department to look after national problems, and, with the consent of the Christian and Moslem members of this department, they made Master Malati its general manager.

After the French left Egypt, Master Gergis El-Gohary, Master Wasef, and Master Malati were protected by the rulers of Egypt. However, in a disturbance at the time of Tahir Pasha, the acting Ottoman governor of Egypt, Moallem Malati was arrested. His head was cut off at Bab Zoweila in Cairo. This happened on 12 Pashons 1519 A.M. (May 19, 1803 AD) He was subsequently canonized by the Coptic Orthodox Church.

External links 
Coptic Synexarium

Coptic Orthodox saints
Coptic Orthodox Christians from Egypt
1803 deaths
19th-century Christian saints
Christian saints killed by Muslims
Year of birth missing
Persecution of Copts